Apodemus avicennicus is a species of rodent found in Iran.

References

Darvish, J.; Javidkar, M.; Siahsarvie, R. 2006. A new species of wood mouse of the genus Apodemus (Rodentia, Muridae) from Iran Zoology in the Middle East

Apodemus
Mammals described in 2009